Young Spectator's Theatre (Театр Юного Зрителя, ТЮЗ) was a standard name of a theatre for children and youth in many cities of the Soviet Union, usually referred to by this abbreviation: тюз, TYuZ (sometimes translated as "TUZ theatre"). The oldest children's theatre under such a name was Moscow TYuZ (Московский театр юного зрителя), created in 1918 and Bryantsev Youth Theatre in Saint Petersburg, opened in 1922.

A TYuZ was typically a stationary theatre, with a dedicated building that housed several scenes, including a puppet theatre.

While considered by many actors to be less prestigious than "adult" theatres, such theatres served well as entertainment for youth not yet sophisticated enough for more mature theatre.

Theatre in the Soviet Union